Rezvanshahr is a city in Yazd province of  Iran. Its ancient name was "Majomerd". It is an ancient place in Yazd from about 2000 years ago.

Populated places in Yazd Province
Cities in Yazd Province